Željko Cupan (born 30 December 1963, in Zagreb) is a Croatian RETIRED football player. Most of his career he spent with Dinamo Zagreb, playing right full-back.

Honours

External sources
http://www.hrrepka.com:8080/app/hnl/prikazIgraca.iface?id=13
http://gnkdinamopovijest.blogspot.com/2011/05/momcad-po-sezonama.html
http://www.navolej.com/Statistika/Godine/1982Detalji.htm

1963 births
Living people
Footballers from Zagreb
Association football fullbacks
Yugoslav footballers
Croatian footballers
GNK Dinamo Zagreb players
HNK Segesta players
Yugoslav First League players
Croatian Football League players